Shumi may refer to:

"Shumi Maritsa", Bulgarian national anthem
Shumishi, or shumi, official title in imperial China
Genzeb Shumi (born 1991), Ethiopian-born middle distance runner
Shumi Dechasa (born 1989), Ethiopian-born Bahraini long distance runner